Skunk Creek is a stream in Warren County in the U.S. state of Missouri. It is a tributary of Peruque Creek.

A variant name was "Skunk Branch". The creek was so named on account of skunks in the area.

See also
List of rivers of Missouri

References

Rivers of Warren County, Missouri
Rivers of Missouri